Pyatimorsk is a rural locality (a settlement) in Ilyevskoye Rural Settlement, Kalachyovsky District, Volgograd Oblast, Russia. The population was 2,657 as of 2010. There are 23 streets.

Geography 
Pyatimorsk is located in steppe, on the bank of the Volga–Don Canal, 10 km southeast of Kalach-na-Donu (the district's administrative centre) by road. Ilyevka is the nearest rural locality.

References 

Rural localities in Kalachyovsky District